Tamkor is a small village in the Jhunjhunu district of Rajasthan in northwest India. Tamkor is also a birthplace of Acharya Shri Mahapragya, who was the tenth head of the Svetambar Terapanth order of Jainism.

Villages in Jhunjhunu district